Standon is a civil parish in the Borough of Stafford, Staffordshire, England. It contains 19 listed buildings that are recorded in the National Heritage List for England. Of these, one is listed at Grade I, the highest of the three grades, one is at Grade II*, the middle grade, and the others are at Grade II, the lowest grade.  The parish contains the village of Standon and the surrounding countryside.  In the parish is Mill Meece Pumping Station, and six buildings on its site are listed.  The other listed buildings consist of two churches, and houses, cottages, and farmhouses, the earlier of which are timber framed or have timber framed cores.


Key

Buildings

References

Citations

Sources

Lists of listed buildings in Staffordshire